Khaled Mosharraf, Bir Uttom (9 November 1937 – 7 November 1975) was a Bangladeshi military officer known for his role in the Bangladesh Liberation War. Khaled was the Sector Commander of Bangladesh Forces Sector 2, leader of the Crack Platoon and K Force (Bangladesh) Brigade Commander during the Bangladesh War of Independence. He fought heroically for Bangladesh's independence and was wounded in front line combat against the Pakistan Army. Under his command K-Force played a crucial role in the unconditional surrender of the Pakistani Army on 16 December 1971. On 23 October, while commanding an operation of the K-Force, Khaled Mosharraf was gravely wounded by enemy fire and required a long period of recovery.
 Although he suffered a bullet injury, he recovered and remained in command of Bangladesh Forces Sector 2.  He is best known as an exceptional combatant who had planned and carried out guerrilla warfare from deep within the jungles of Melaghar.
More than thirty five thousand guerilla fighters fought under Khaled's command in sector 2. 

Following independence, he was raised to the rank of Major General– the highest rank in the army at that time –and appointed Chief of Army Staff. He was awarded Bir Uttam for his gallantry during the war. On 3 November 1975, Mosharraf led a coup against the Mushtaq Administration who had conspired and seized power in Bangladesh following the assassination of President Sheikh Mujibur Rahman, but during the military uprising on 7 November, he was himself overthrown and assassinated.

Early life and army career
Khaled Mosharraf was born in the village of Mosharraf Ganj in Islampur, Jamalpur district, of the province of Bengal, British India (now in Bangladesh). He was born on 9 November 1937 at village Mosharrafganj in Islampur upazila of Jamalpur District, to Mosharraf Hossain and Jamila Akhter. His father was a jute merchant, Khaled's hometown Moshharrafganj was named after his father. He moved to stay with his maternal uncle SR khan, who was serving as C&B Engineer in Cox’s Bazar. He passed the matriculation examination from Cox's Bazar Government High School in 1953. He gained admission in Dhaka College from where he started his journey as political activist during that time. Khaled Mosharraf was often described as a brilliant student with excellent oratory skill.  As a young student, he was active in political events of the then East Pakistan's language movement of 1952. He was elected one of the panel secretaries of Dhaka College Awami League. Graduating from the Dhaka College in 1955, he joined the Pakistan Army. He became an adjutant of the 4th Bengal regiment during the Indo-Pakistani War of 1965. He served as an instructor at the military academy and obtained an advanced degree from the Command and Staff College in Quetta. He was trained in West Germany and the United Kingdom before becoming commander of the 4th Bengal Regiment during the Bangladesh Liberation War.

Bangladesh Forces Commander in the War of Independence
After 25 March 1971, the Pakistan Army occupied the capital, Dhaka, and the rest of the country and carried out brutal 1971 Bangladesh Genocide.  Major Mosharraf was appointed commanding officer of the 4th battalion of East Bengal Regiment in Comilla Cantonment on 24 March 1971. Of all three Brigade Commanders, Khaled Mosharraf was the one who most accurately assessed the psychological aspect of the war. Khaled decided to adopt a two-pronged, mutually reinforcing strategy to fight Pakistan Army and he was successful on both counts. He led his brigade in mutiny following the declaration of independence on behalf of Bangabandhu Sheikh Mujibur Rahman 26 March 1971.
As early as the last week of March, Khaled contacted Rehman Sobhan to convince the political leadership that a Government is formed with immediate effect, and to formally commission Mukti Bahini as the Army of Independent Bangladesh. As Khaled felt without a Government and commission, Mukti Bahini would be considered illegitimate rebels or terrorists in the eyes of the law and Pakistan Government could take advantage of that situation. Khaled’s request had been duly inscribed in the declaration by Tajuddin Ahmad.
Later the ‘legally constituted’ in this oath of freedom fighters was also commanded by Khaled.
On the evening of 26 March, he announced, "From this moment on, I pledge allegiance to sovereign Bangla. From this day, we have no loyalties to Pakistan. Raise the flags of independent Bangla." He merged his unit into a guerrilla force and later served as one of its leading commanders.

In the article “Khaled Musharraf, Bir Uttam - The Commander”, the author wrote:
Khaled Mosharraf successfully led The Crack Platoon, a guerrilla unit in Sector 2. The first guerrilla operation of Crack Platoon was carried out in Dhaka on 9 June 1971. Khaled raised this special guerrilla force composed of the students of the city’s major educational institutions, young professionals, and political activists of Dhaka. Under Khaled's leadership Crack Platoon carried out number of heroic operations in the Pakistan Army occupied capital and around Dhaka. Bombs were exploded and major Power stations were blown up. From June 1971 onwards, these guerrilla units started launching attacks one after the other on different establishments in the city including Intercontinental Hotel Dhaka and USIS Building using hit-and-run tactics. The occupying Pakistan army failed to organise any auxiliary force in support of its occupation in Dhaka.

Khaled mosharraf played a key role in the historical meeting of Teliapara. The meeting was attended by M. A. G. Osmani, Major Ziaur Rahman, Major K M Shafiullah, Major Shafayat Jamil, and Major Kazi Nuruzzaman and few other officers of Revolted Bengal Regiment. Major Khaled’s role was instrumental to make Bangladesh Forces of the Liberation War a formidable and sustainable and few officer who were presentbat the historic Telipara meeting acknowledged the fact that Khaled Mosharraf had set the trend and planned strategy to fight against the Pakistan Army It was decided The whole area of East Pakistan would be divided into 11 sectors with the direction of regular forces consisted of the three forces: Z Force (Bangladesh) under the command of Major Ziaur Rahman, K Force (Bangladesh) under Khaled Mosharraf and S Force (Bangladesh) under K M Shafiullah.

Khaled built the largest training center and operations headquarters for Bangladesh's freedom fighters in Melaghar, Tripura in 1971. He was determined not give the occupying Pakistan Army in Dhaka a moment's relief. Sector No. 2's daring campaigns covered a vast territory including Dhaka, Comilla, Noakhali, Madaripur and Shariatpur.

While the war was ongoing, the K Force was created under his leadership. Under his command, the valiant fighters of the Crack Platoon and K Force led one audacious operation after another and constantly routed the Pakistani army. Due to the properly strategised operations of this sector the Dhaka-Chittagong highway in between was denied to the Pakistanis throughout the nine months of war of liberation and stretched Pakistan Army's supply lines, which made it exceptionally difficult for Pak Junta to conduct counterinsurgency measures inside Bangladesh.
Khaled merged his unit into a guerrilla force and later served as one of its leading commanders. Guerrilla fighter Shafi Imam Rumi took training for the war in Melaghar, Agartala under Sector-2, supervised by Mosharraf and Abu Taher Mohammad Haider. After his training, he came to Dhaka to join the Crack Platoon, a group that conducted major guerrilla operations against the Pakistan Army. His major target was to bomb the Siddhirganj Power Station.
Khaled and his forces didn't rest after targeting structures inside the capital, he was determined to hamper the Pakistan Army’s supply line, hence, he devised strategies to destroy bridges and culverts across Bangladesh.

At the end of June 1971, Shahadat Chowdhury and Habibul Alam came to Rumi's ( Son of Jahanara Imam ) father Sharif's house with a letter from Khaled Mosharraf. Khaled asked for information on bridges and culverts of Bangladesh to hamper the Pakistani occupation army's movement. Khaled sent a letter asking the experts and engineers for detailed information to identify the structural weaknesses in each bridge, and also on the exact points where to set explosives so that the bridge will not only be damaged, but also s be repaired easily after the country is liberated.

In the book “Bullets of 1971”,the author wrote, “khaled revolted against the Pakistan authority in Brahmanbaria, where he was stationed at that time. He led the Bengali soldiers under his command out of the pakistani cantonment and ambushed a Pakistani convoy going to Chittagong. Major khaled's troop destroyed the enemy convoy. The damage to the enemy was unprecedented.
In retaliation pakistan authority sent a larger contingent under the command of a Major General to capture Khaled dead or alive.
Major khaled fought ferociously against the enemy with limited resources. However, once again, the Pakistani Army suffered heavy damages at Major khaled Mossharraf's hands and the enemy was forced to retreat.
After the battle Pakistan High Command acknowledged the bravery of Major khaled Mosharrof and admitted, "We have trained Major Khaled so well that even a Major General wasn't enough to defeat him." Khaled Mosharraf was also held in high esteem by his Freedom Fighter colleagues who fought under him during the liberation war. Freedom fighter Habibul Alam, Bir Pratik in his book "Brave of Hearts" wrote:

Following the Bangladesh War of Independence and the establishment of an independent Bangladesh, Mosharraf was appointed as the staff officer to the HQ of the new Bangladesh Army in Dhaka. In 1973 after attaining the rank of brigadier, he was appointed to the post of Chief of General Staff. He was also awarded the military honour Bir Uttom for gallantry by the independent government of Bangladesh in 1972.

Coup of 1975
Following the assassination of Sheikh Mujibur Rahman, the country's president, on 15 August 1975, a new government composing of anti-Mujib political elements was formed under Khondaker Mostaq Ahmad.
Mushtaq Ahmad immediately took control of the situation, proclaiming himself as president. Major General Ziaur Rahman was appointed as Chief of Army Staff of the Bangladesh Army, replacing K M Shafiullah. Khondaker Mostaq Ahmad praised those derailed military officials (killers of Sheikh Mujibur Rahman) calling them shurjo shontan (sons of the sun). These disgruntled officers who killed Sheikh Mujibur Rahman captured the Bangabhaban (president's official residence) and started dictating the President, causing extreme chaos in the barely four year old Nation. Khaled Mosharraf, who was the Chief of General staff of Bangladesh Army, had asked Ziaur Rahman for the chain of command in Bangladesh Army to be restored which had been rudely interrupted in 15 August. But the Chief of Army Staff (Bangladesh) General Ziaur Rahman, did not display the slightest ability or intention or both to act against the killers.
Ahmed also ordered 4 national leaders (former Vice-President Syed Nazrul Islam, former prime minister of Bangladesh Tajuddin Ahmed and Captain (Rtd.) Mansur Ali, and former Home Minister A H M Quamruzzaman to be put behind the bar as they declined to support the "illegitimate government" and eventually killed just ahead of a counter-coup that ousted the August plotters. The prosecution evidence suggested Mushtaq himself had ordered the assassins entry inside the prison to kill the four leaders.
Khondaker Mostaq Ahmad even issued the Indemnity Ordinance, which gave immunity from prosecution to the killers of Mujib, later the ordinance was passed by Ziaur Rahman.
Outraged at Mujib's killing and the protection of his killers, khaled Mosharraf mobilized pro-Mujib army units with Colonel Shafaat Jamil of 46 Brigade to overthrow Ahmad's regime on 3 November. His main motive was to bring back the chain-of-command in the Bangladesh Army, and to achieve that Khaled Mosharraf decided to stop these killers residing inside the Bangabhaban and staged a coup d'état among the Army.
On 3 November 1975, under his order, the Bangladesh Army brought an end to the illegal rule of Khondaker Mostaq Ahmad. Khaled Mosharraf freed Bangabhaban from the occupation of the killers of Sheikh Mujibur Rahman. In accordance with his order, the Chief of Military Staff of the Bangladesh Army Major General Ziaur Rahman was put under house arrest.

After he had Ziaur Rahman and other members of the government arrested, Khaled took charge as Chief of Army Staff.
 Mosharraf installed Justice Abu Sadat Mohammad Sayem as president. It is said that, "To all intents and purposes, Khaled was certainly on the right track in creating the conditions that would free the country of the usurpers who had been in charge since mid-August 1975. But, then, his strategy went wrong in the matter of sustaining his coup."
After assassination of Sheikh Mujibur Rahman, no one could get into the street to protest. A procession was brought out from the Dhaka University area to Bangabandhu’s Dhanmondi Residence to pay homage to Bangabandhu.
Khaled’s mother and brother Rashed Mosharraf had led a commemorative procession to Mujib's family residence without his knowledge. However, a mutiny on 7 November consisting of left-wing non-enlisted personnel in the army, organized and led by the radical left-wing JSD leader Abu Taher, resulted in the assassination of Mosharraf. Describing the 7 November Mutiny Captain Sachin Karmakar in The Daily Observer (Bangladesh) wrote:

As recorded by history, 7 November 1975 Bangladesh coup d'état was launched by left winger Colonel Abu Taher. He organized the soldiers loyal to him to free Ziaur Rahman who had been put under House Arrest. Some jawans from the Bengal Lancers and 2 Field Artillery came over to urge the 10th East Bengal troops to join the mutiny. The trouble seemed to have spread rapidly. Pro Abu Taher forces broke into the military armoury to loot stockpiles weapons and boarded military trucks in order to take control of all the key installations points (KIP) around the city. A contingent of soldiers went in military chief's residence in Dhaka Cantonment and freed Ziaur Rahman from house arrest.
 Khaled Mosharraf and Lieutenant Colonel A.T.M Haider tried to resist the coup, but it became impossible as pro-Zia forces arrayed against him and they were spreading the lie that he was an Indian/Russian agent.

As soon as Ziaur Rahman became free, they were killed by pro Ziaur-Taher officers.  Major Jalil and Major Assad shot General Khaled, Colonel Hayder and Colonel K.N Huda in a coup .

Assassination

On 6 November 1975, Major General Mosharraf, with two other fellow officers, Colonel Najmul Huda and Lt. Colonel A.T.M. Haider, went to the 10th East Bengal Regiment.  Next morning, i.e., on 7 November 1975, at 11 am, under the order of an officer from the 2nd Field Regiment Artillery (rumoured to be Lieutenant Colonel Mohiuddin Ahmed, later executed on 28 January 2010 for killing Sheikh Mujibur Rahman), Captain Asad and Captain Jalil of the 10th East Bengal Regiment shot and killed Mosharraf and his two fellow officers. Ironically, both Asad and Jalil fought in K force under Mosharraf during the Bangladesh Liberation War, and Mosharraf had once saved Asad's life while risking his own. Mosharraf's body was left under a date tree inside the cantonment for a certain amount of time. The way the killing of Major General Khaled Mosharraf took place,  changed the course of the Bangladesh’s fate forever.

Personal life 
Khaled Mosharraf was survived by his wife Salma Khaled and three daughters Mahjabeen, Ammereen and Taireen. His eldest daughter Mahjabeen Khaled was a Member of Parliament (MP) from her ancestral area of Islampur Upazila in Jamalpur District of Mymensingh Division. She also served as a member of the Parliamentary Standing Committee on Foreign Affairs. Mahjabeen Khaled is also the Chairperson of Khaled Mosharraf Trust. Khaled’s brother Rashed Mosharraf was the President of Bangladesh Krishak League. Rashed Mosharraf was elected to the parliament from his Jamalpur constituency six times and served as a minister of state.

Portrayal
Mosharraf was portrayed in 1974 film Sangaram as the character named Major Hassan. Darashiko was acted as the character.

References

1938 births
1975 deaths
1975 murders in Bangladesh
Mosharraf, Khaled
People murdered in Bangladesh
Recipients of the Bir Uttom
Bangladesh Army generals
Dhaka College alumni
People from Jamalpur District
Deaths by firearm in Bangladesh